S. Andrew Swann (alternately S. A. Swann, S. A. Swiniarski, and Steven Krane) is an American science fiction and fantasy author living in Solon, Ohio, a suburb of Cleveland, where much of his fiction is set. He was born Steven Swiniarski and has published some of his books as Swiniarski, and some as Swann. He has been published by DAW Books and by Ballantine Spectra, a division of Random House.

Books 
Per Swann's official bibliography, he has published twenty-five regular novels. Eleven of these have been collected in five omnibus editions.
 The Moreau Quartet (four books; 3 omnibus editions)
 Forests of the Night (DAW Books Inc., 1993)
 Specters of the Dawn (DAW Books Inc., 1994)
 Emperors of the Twilight (DAW Books Inc., 1994)
 Fearful Symmetries (DAW Books Inc., 1999)
 The Moreau Omnibus (DAW Books Inc., 2003)
 The Moreau Quartet Volume One (DAW Books Inc., 2015)
 The Moreau Quartet Volume Two (DAW Books Inc., October 6, 2015)
 The Hostile Takeover Trilogy (three books; 1 omnibus edition)
 Profiteer (DAW Books Inc., 1995)
 Partisan (DAW Books Inc., 1995)
 Revolutionary (DAW Books Inc., 1996)
 The Hostile Takeover Trilogy (DAW Books Inc., 2004)
 Apotheosis Trilogy (three books)
 Prophets (DAW Books Inc., 2009)
 Heretics (DAW Books Inc., 2010)
 Messiah (DAW Books Inc., 2011)
 The Cleveland Portal Series (two books; 1 omnibus edition)
 Dragons of the Cuyahoga (DAW Books Inc., 2001)
 Dwarves of Whiskey Island (DAW Books Inc., 2005)
 Dragons & Dwarves (DAW Books Inc., 2009)
 The Wolf Series (two books)
 Wolfbreed (Spectra, 2009)
 Wolf's Cross (Spectra, 2010)
 The Dragon* series (three books)
 Dragon•Princess (DAW Books Inc., 2014)
 Dragon•Thief (DAW Books Inc., 2015)
 Dragon•Wizard (DAW Books Inc., 2016)
 Standalones (three books)
 God's Dice (DAW Books Inc., 1997)
 Zimmerman's Algorithm (DAW Books Inc., 2000)
 Broken Crescent (DAW Books Inc., 2004)

Writing as S. A. Swiniarski (two books, 1 omnibus edition) 
 Raven (DAW Books Inc., 1996)
 The Flesh, the Blood, & the Fire (DAW Books Inc., 1998)
 Blood & Rust (DAW Books Inc., 2007)

Writing as Steven Krane (three books) 
 Teek (DAW Books Inc., 1999)
 The Omega Game (DAW Books Inc., 2000)
 Stranger Inside (DAW Books Inc., 2003)

Interactive fiction 
He has also published an interactive novel.
 Welcome to Moreytown (Choice of Games, 2017)
 Sword of the Slayer (Choice of Games, 2019)

Collaborative Fiction 
 S Andrew Swann's Proposal (SCP Wiki, 2011)

See also 
 Libertarian science fiction
 Anarcho-capitalist literature

References

External links
  S. Andrew Swann's Home Page
 S. Andrew Swann's Blog
 S. Andrew Swann's Bibliography
 

20th-century American novelists
21st-century American novelists
American male novelists
American science fiction writers
Living people
Writers from Cleveland
American male short story writers
20th-century American short story writers
21st-century American short story writers
20th-century American male writers
21st-century American male writers
Novelists from Ohio
Year of birth missing (living people)
20th-century pseudonymous writers
21st-century pseudonymous writers
SCP Foundation